Thomas Building was a high rise building in Indianapolis, Indiana. It was completed in 1895 and had 13 floors. It was primarily used for office space. It was heavily damaged in the W. T. Grant fire on November 5, 1973 and subsequently demolished.

See also
List of tallest buildings in Indianapolis

External links
Thomas Building at Emporis

Notes

Skyscraper office buildings in Indianapolis
Office buildings completed in 1895
Burned buildings and structures in the United States
1895 establishments in Indiana